Viva Zalata is a 1976 Egyptian western comedy film directed by Hassan Hafez.

Synopsis
Zalata immigrates to New Mexico, where he becomes a city hero and eventually mayor. After he is killed by Billy the Kid, his daughter Negma returns to Egypt to find her cousin Metwali for a revenge mission. A playboy and more lover than fighter, Metwali decides to accompany his cousin back to New Mexico. Learning a lot along the way, he avenges his uncle and marries Negma, returning to the Al-Hussainiya neighborhood of Cairo to settle down.

Cast 
 Fouad el-Mohandes as Zalata/Metwali
 Shwikar as Negma
 Samir Ghanem as Chief Yellow Cloud
 Tawfik el-Deken as wagon train leader	
 Nabila El Sayed as saloon owner
 Hassan Mustafa as the Sheriff
 Mahmoud Morsi
 Gamal Ismail as General Batista
 Salama Elias as casino owner
 Nabil Al-Hajrasi as respresentative of the Ministry of Tourism
 Osama Abbas as United States government representative
 Nabil Badr as Mexican government representative
 Zouzou Shakib as Zainab al-Alameh
 Seif Allah Mokhtar as follower of Zalata
 Helmi Halali as wagon train member
 Hassan Abdin as King Size
 Ahmed Nabil as follower of Zalata
 Mohamed Taha as friend of Metwali
 Ahmed Shokry
 Mahmoud Abu Zeid as Qaza’a, the sheriff’s deputy
 Zakariya Mowafi as Hani, the saloon owner’s son
 Izz al-din Islam as undertaker
 Almontaser Bellah as follower of Zalata
 Samiha Mohamed as shopkeeper’s wife
 Sayed Mounir
 Hussein Fahmy as Billy the Kid
 El-Toukhy Tawfiq as wagon train member
 Mohamed Sobhi

See also 
 Cinema of Egypt
 Lists of Egyptian films
 List of Egyptian films of the 1970s
 List of Egyptian films of 1976

References

External links 
 
 Viva Zalata on elCinema.com

1970s Arabic-language films
1976 films
1970s Western (genre) comedy films
1970s adventure comedy films
Egyptian Western (genre) films
Egyptian adventure comedy films
Films shot in Egypt
1976 comedy films